The Izaute is a river in south-western France, a right tributary of the Gélise.

Geography 

It has its origin in the commune  Dému in the  Gers (32)  it joins the Gélise on the border of Lot-et-Garonne close to Saint-Pé-Saint-Simon .

Departments and principal cities

 Gers: Lannepax, Bretagne-d'Armagnac, Cazeneuve, Labarrère

References

Rivers of France
Rivers of Occitania (administrative region)
Rivers of Gers